Gwanghwamun Love Song is a musical directed by Lee GiNa, written by Ko Sun Woong, composed by Lee Young Hoon and choreographed by Seo Byung Koo. It is about memory, true love and death. It was co-produced by CJ E&M and Seoul City Musical Company.

Plot 

In 2017, a middle-aged man, Myungwoo, was in a coma before death. Wulha (god who takes care of human events). He appears in front of Myungwoo and takes him on a journey through his past. The first place that the God brings him to is the moment when Myungwoo meets his first love, Soo-Ah, in the spring of 1984 painting competition. Myungwoo falls in love with this passionate and motivated woman. However, when Myungwoo witnesses Soo-Ah getting attacked by the police during a riot, he feels guilty because he cannot protect her, and eventually leaves her. Myungwoo searches through the moments of regret in his past with Wulha and is led to a mysterious empty house that he cannot remember.

Casting

Gwanghwamun love song

Old version 
The musical started on March 20, 2011. The composer Lee-Young hoon was passionate about writing the musical and continued writing even while hospitalized. Oh Se-hoon, the mayor of Seoul, and Lee Moon-se attended the opening night performance. Over 40,000 seats were booked before opening night. It received favourable reviews online. People wrote “I can reminisce about the good old days”, “It feels like getting a present from my memory”, and “I cannot sleep after watching its performance”.

New version  
When a musical reopens its series, the crews often refer to the reopening musical as ‘the upgrade’. However, Gwanghwamun Love Song went through a major construction. This musical was the first musical that altered each scene.

Actors 
Gwanghwamun Love Song cast both Sunghwa Jung and Jiyeon Cha as Wulha, which is unusual because they are different genders. Theatre companies often double or triple cast regardless of gender, but this can be more complex in a musical because of the differences in male and female vocal ranges.

Set list

Performance schedule

References 

South Korean musicals